MACHO-1997-BLG-41, commonly abbreviated as 97-BLG-41 or MACHO-97-BLG-41, was a gravitational microlensing event located in Sagittarius which occurred in July 1999. The lens star is a binary system approximately 10,000 light-years away in the constellation Sagittarius. The two stars are separated from each other by about 0.9 AU and have an orbital period of around 1.5 years. The most likely mass of the system is about 0.3 times that of the Sun. Star A and star B are both red dwarfs.

The individual components were assigned masses 0.6 and 0.16 times that of the Sun, making them an orange dwarf of spectral class K and a class M red dwarf, respectively. According to this model, a planet with around 3.5 times the mass of Jupiter orbits in a circumbinary orbit around the two stars at a distance of around 7 AU (assuming random orientation of the system).

Subsequently, an independent analysis with data from five different observatories revealed that the microlensing event could be interpreted as being caused by a low-mass binary system of two red dwarf stars located in the galactic disk if one considers their orbital motion, without the need to invoke a planetary mass. A further study combining both datasets confirmed this finding. The planet is thus considered disproven.

See also 

Hypothetical astronomical object
Delta Trianguli
PSR B1620−26
HD 202206

References

External links 

Notes for 97-BLG-41 on The Extrasolar Planets Encyclopaedia

Sagittarius (constellation)
Binary stars
M-type main-sequence stars
Gravitational lensing
19990620